Sarcocystis accipitris is a species of parasites of the genus Sarcocystis.

Description 
This species was described by Cern and Kvasnovsk in 1986.

The sarcocysts measure 15 to 17 by 13 to 15 micrometres in diameter.

Clinical features and host pathology 
The only known hosts of this species are the Eurasian goshawk (Accipiter gentilis) - the definitive host - and the canary (Serinus canaria) - the intermediate host.

References 

Species described in 1986
Conoidasida
Parasites of birds